The CBR Building is a functionalist office building situated in Watermael-Boitsfort, a municipality of Brussels, Belgium. Designed by the architects Constantin Brodzki and Marcel Lambrichs and built between 1967 and 1970, its prefabricated modular facade showcases white concrete instead of hiding it as a construction material, classifying the building as a New Brutalist piece of architecture. In November 2018, it was added to the list of protected heritage within the Brussels-Capital Region.

Description

Architecture
The building is made up of two parallel wings attached to each other but slightly offset. Designed to highlight the qualities of the material produced by Belgian cement works, its facade is made up of an assembly of 756 prefabricated oval modules in molded white cement concrete. The western facade has twenty-six bays of nine floors. There are no window frames and the panes, tinted orange, are set directly in the concrete which, during construction, involved the installation of a complete air conditioning system, the first of its kind in Belgium.

Constantin Brodzki saw the potential of using concrete as more than just a construction material and wanted to exploit its formal freedom to create organic shapes. It took him years, in cooperation with the CBR company and two Portuguese brothers, to be able to craft the prefabricated modules used in the facade. They started by producing dozens of different testing models which, once perfected, were used to create a mould in epoxy. This mould was used to produce the 756 modules needed, after which the construction happened very quickly. This method of construction allowed the building to be erected as quickly as one floor per week.

Original interior

The interior features mahogany partitions, parquet floors, bush-hammered concrete details and a concrete spiral staircase from the ground floor to the basement restaurant. The finish is particularly meticulous on the eighth floor "composed of rosewood partition systems, with extremely refined care given, even to the design of the lever handles, door handles, signage, furniture...". Every material, detail and finishing in the building was chosen by the architects themselves, even the buttons on the elevator. 

The interior fittings and furniture give the building the "character of a total and complete work". Some of the furniture Brodzki designed himself in collaboration with his friend and neighbour, the interior architect Jules Wabbes, as well as the American designer Florence Knoll.

Occupation
The construction was initiated in 1967 by the CBR cement company, who produce and sell a large variety of cements for construction in Brussels, as they needed new infrastructure for their headquarters. The aim for the building was to showcase their abilities and knowledge in working with concrete.

In 2017, the CBR was forced to move their headquarters, as the building was no longer up to their standards. The building went vacant for a year after which the coworking company Fosbury & Sons, founded by Stijn Geeraerts, Maarten Van Gool and Serge Hannecart, saw their opportunity and occupied the building to create new coworking spaces. Now the building is often used for public lectures and events, as it accommodates a small auditorium, a restaurant, a bar and even a small club.

Renovation
When in 2017 the CBR moved their headquarters, there was concern that the building would be demolished. Twenty-five architects petitioned for the preservation of the building. Rudi Vervoort, Minister-President of the Brussels-Capital Region, responded by initiating the process of adding the CBR Building to the list of protected heritage in Brussels (which protects the building's exterior). Later on, he also assured an optimal preservation of the building during its renovation by Fosbury & Sons.

In 2019, the renovation was complete and Fosbury & Sons occupied the building. The original wooden cabinets were disassembled, renovated and reinstalled; the concrete staircase with its handrail was renovated as well. Most of the other original pieces such as the built-in units, authentic door handles, radiator caps and wooden window casings were preserved. There were also modern additions, which kept in mind the original materials, as to not disrupt the architectural unity.

Location and surroundings
The CBR building is located at 185, / in Watermael-Boitsfort, adjacent to the Sonian Forest and ten minutes away from the Avenue Louise/Louizalaan, connecting Brussels' city centre.

The gardens surrounding the building were created by the landscape architect . Some of his works include the gardens of the 1958 Brussels World's Fair (Expo '58), the 1937 Paris Expo, the upper part of the Botanical Garden of Brussels, the Mont des Arts/Kunstberg and more. His work is still visible around the building, surrounding it in a vibrant green landscape.

The neighbouring buildings are exclusively dedicated to office-based architecture, strictly distinguished from the residential neighbourhoods closer to the city centre. The office scenery is divided by two large crossing roads, bringing in a constant flow of traffic.

Publications
The CBR building was the only Belgian project selected for the 1979 MoMA exhibition - 'Transformations in Modern Architecture between 1960 and 1980', where it was celebrated for setting a precedent in expressive facades using prefabricated concrete modules.

The building was also mentioned in a publication by the KU Leuven Faculty of Architecture called WTC Tower Teachings, where Marc Dubois described the CBR Building as an example of qualitative real estate architecture within Brussels.

References

Notes

Buildings and structures in Brussels
Watermael-Boitsfort
Protected heritage sites in Brussels
Functionalist architecture